Luo Xi (born 2 March 1991) is a Chinese footballer currently playing as a defender for Chinese club Hunan HBS Mangguoba.

Club career
Luo Xi would make his professional debut in a league game for Shenzhen Ruby within the 2011 Chinese Super League season against Tianjin TEDA on 1 April 2011, in a game that ended in a 1-0 defeat.

Career statistics

Notes

References

External links

1991 births
Living people
Chinese footballers
Association football defenders
Chinese Super League players
China League One players
China League Two players
Beijing Guoan F.C. players
Shenzhen F.C. players
Shanghai Shenhua F.C. players
Beijing Sport University F.C. players
Meizhou Hakka F.C. players